Dor is a rural locality (a village) in Verkhovskoye Rural Settlement, Verkhovazhsky District, Vologda Oblast, Russia. The population was 69 as of 2002.

Geography 
Dor is located 40 km southwest of Verkhovazhye (the district's administrative centre) by road. Botyzhnaya is the nearest rural locality.

References 

Rural localities in Verkhovazhsky District